Tomatlán (meaning "Tomato land" or "place of tomato" from Nahuatl) is a town and municipality, in Jalisco south of Cabo Corrientes in central-western Mexico. The municipality covers an area of 153 km².

As of 2015, the municipality had a total population of 35,824 people.

The final portion of Yann Martel's novel Life of Pi is set in Tomatlán, where the character Pi Patel reaches land after being stranded in the Pacific Ocean.

History

Before the arrival of the conquerors, the region was populated by various groups. On Holy Monday of 1525, from El Tuito the conquerors arrived in Tomatlan. The night they spent the night in a village of the cacique, they received them with dances and plumeríos. They wore crowns and scapulars, as they were part of the Province of Los Coronados de El Tuito. There they celebrated Holy Week and Easter. In the place occupied by the Cué, a pagan shrine, they built a “pajarete” church that Brother Juan de Villa Diego blessed, dedicating it to San Antonio.

They baptized the town and the river with the name of Easter, subsequently following Colima. Thus this town was subdued by Francisco Cortés de San Buenaventura. The region was very inhabited. Disseminated in it there were numerous villages currently occupying the place of some, small rancherías.

In 1541 this region revolted and had to go with its people Pedro de Alvarado from Santiago de Manzanillo twice to fight the insurgents. From 1533 to 1574 it was entrusted to Juan Fernández de Híjar with a seat in Villa de Purificación.

Through the proclamation the town knew, in 1730, that English soldiers were disembarking in the cove of Arcos and that the Justice of the Valley of Banderas lacked soldiers to make the defense. 50 soldiers and 100 locals came to the aid of him. They were commanded by Captain Diego de Betancourt.

At the beginning of the War of Independence in the year of 1810, Cura Miguel Hidalgo y Costilla sent his nephew Miguel the Lego Gallaga to coordinate the movement on the coasts of Colima, Jalisco and Nayarit.5

In October 1811, after the battle of Palo Blanco, Lego Gallaga, together with Sandoval and Toral, he retired to Mascota and the Coast along the course of the Banderas Valley, where he separated from them, reaching Tomatlán. Gallaga made words with the Sandoval, then, one of those who accompanied Sandoval made fire on the Lego, who was seriously injured. Sandoval immediately ordered him to be shot in front of the Temple of Santo Santiago; Gallaga, lying there on her knees, implored the mercy of God, sold her eyes herself with her handkerchief, and gave the voice of fire falling dead with two bullets. The Indians who were very fond of him, picked up his body, took him to the presbytery of the parish, opened a sepulcher in which an ecclesiastic was buried in a drawer from which they took him out, and then deposited the remains of Gallaga, being the tragic one The end of this famous layman, who gave so much to the troops of Nueva Galicia.
Since 1825 belonged to the 6th. Canton of Autlán until 1878 when it happens to depend on the 10 canton of Mascota. The decree of September 23, 1878 already refers to Tomatlán as a municipal entity.

Location 
Tomatlán is located west of the state at coordinates 19° 56’ 13" north latitude and 105° 15’ 0" west longitude; at a height of 50 meters above sea level.

Municipal limits 

It has administrative limits with the following municipalities and / or geographical accidents, according to its location:

Orography 

Its surface is made up of rugged areas (42%), hills and mountains that have heights ranging from 200 to 1,100 meters above sea level; semi-flat areas (41%) on hills and slopes with heights from 125 to 200 meters above sea level, and flat areas (17%).

The composition of the soils is of predominant types cambisol, already Eutrico or Chromic, Feozem Háplico and Regosol Eutrico; to the north of the population are small strips of Acrisol Ortico.

The municipality has a territorial area of 265,750 hectares, of which 44,224 are used for agricultural purposes, 112,400 in livestock activity, 108,220 are for forest use and 886 hectares are urban land, not specifying the use of 20. As far as the property refers to an extension of 124,669 hectares is private and another of 87,081 is ejidal; 54,000 hectares are communal property.

Hydrography 

This municipality belongs to the central Pacific basin, sub-basin Tomatlán River. Its main currents are: Llano Grande river and streams: Los Prietos, Coyula, La Quemada, El Salado, Las Ánimas, El Tule and others of minor importance. They are also part of its hydrological resources, the dams: Cajón de Peñas, El Cobano and San Juan, in addition to the Laguna del Tule.

Climate 

The climate is semi-dry, with dry winter and spring, and warm, with no well-defined winter thermal change. The average annual temperature is 26.9 °C, with a maximum of 34.1 °C and a minimum of 19.6 °C. The rainfall regime is recorded in the month of October with an average rainfall of 892.2 millimeters. The annual average of days with frosts is 33. The prevailing winds are heading south to north.

Localities that make up the municipality 

California Canyon, Benito Juárez, Cacaluta, SAGAR Camp, Acosta Field, Texas Canada, Cimarronas, Corralito de Piloto, Coyula, Realito Cruise, Gargantillo Cruise, CONASUPO Cruise, Habal Cruise, Pilot Cruise, Dam Cruise Cajón de Peña, El Acautal, Hot Water, Avocado, Alejo, Anono, El Aserradero del Reparo, El Avalito, El Cacao, El Caimán, El Carrizalillo, El Chicharrón, El Coco, El Corrido, El Criadero, El Cruise, El Divisadero, El Divisadero de la Cumbre, El Donocito, El Edén (El Chorro), El Gacho, El Guamúchil, El Guasimal, El Guayabillo, El Limón, El Mangal, El Mapache, El Nacastal, El Naranjo, El Nogal, El Ocotillo, El Palmarito, El Paraíso, El Platanar, El Portezuelo, El Porvenir, El Realito, El Recodo, El Swirl, El Rescate, El Rincón de los Robles, El Salitre, El Sube y Baja, El Taray, El Tigre, El Tule, El Zarco, Emiliano Zapata Yautepec (Agua Zarca), Guayacán, Hidalgo, Higuera Blanca, José María Morelos,

José María Pino Suárez, La Cruz de Loreto, La Cueva, La Cumbre, Florida, La Fortuna, La Garita, La Gloria, Gargantillo, La Higuerita, La Lima, La Loma, La Mesa, La Palmera de Don Chayo, La Palomita, The Painted Stone, The Painted, The Providence, The Napkin, The Surprise, The Tavern, The Turpentine, La Villita, La Virgencita, Las Animas, Las Jarillas, Las Partidas, Las Pilitas, Las Porras,

Las Tunitas, Lázaro Cárdenas (La Nancy), Llano del Toro, Llano Grande, López Mateos, Los Ángeles, Los Atascaderos, Los Charcos, Los Cimientos, Los Cobertizos, Los Corralitos, Los Coyotes, Los Diques, Los Guayabitos, Los Horcones, Los Llanitos, Los Naranjos, Los Sauces, Los Tecomates, Los Terreros, Macuautitlán, Malobaco, Mariano Otero, Mismaloya, Modelo, Nuevo Nahuapa, Nuevo Santiago, Palmillas, Palmira, Pando Grande, Paso del Guamúchil, Plan de Ayala, Pochotitán, Presa Cajón de Peña, Puentecillas, San Antonio, San Carlos Coacoyul, San Cayetano, San Francisco (Palo Blancal), San Ignacio (Juan Ignacio), San Isidro, San Miguel, San Rafael de los Moreno, Santa Alejandra, Santa Elena, Santa Gertrudis, Santa María, Sayulapa, Tejerías, Teocinte (Teocintle), Tequesquite, Tierras Blancas, Tomatlán, Tres Puertas, Majahuas Valley (El Poblado), Vicente Guerrero (Las Lomas Coloradas), Viejo Nahuapa, Cabrel, El Ginger.

Economy 

Cattle, pigs, sheep and goats are raised, in addition to birds and hives.
Farming produce highlights include corn, sorghum, rice, tobacco, watermelon, plantain, mango, papaya, pineapple, sunflower, chile, sesame and coconut palm.
Precious woods are exploited such as: barcino, parota, mahogany, habillo, cedar, tampicirano, spring and purple rose.
Mainly bass, brown, bass and carp are caught.

There are establishments that sell basic necessities and mixed stores that sell small-scale diverse items.
Financial, professional, technical, communal, social, personal, tourist and maintenance services are provided.
There are currently small industries in the municipal seat. The main branches are the transformation of food, dairy products, pastures and construction.

The main salt mines of the state of Jalisco are found.

Tourism

El Chorro
This beach, located 10 km from the town of La Gloria, is of strong waves, an idea for fishing, it is a scenario where we find dunes, mangroves, and warm sands that divide the sea and the estuary.

Peñitas 
Magnificent beach framed by large rocks which allude to its name, Peñitas is considered a unique and very rare place, since in it we can appreciate the passage of a Nahuatl culture that predominantly dominated the large municipality of Tomatlán, the stones painted with Petroglyphs that exist in this medium-textured sandy beach, they suggest that our ancestors appreciated the beauty of Peñitas, leaving us their message so that future generations would know that this beach was considered favorite among the natives.

Costa Majahuas 
The beach of Majahuas has strong waves, it is attractive for fishing and for this reason we have the visit of people who love sport fishing during the year, during Easter the camp is traditional, since most of the families of many towns in the municipality, move at that time of year to spend a holiday in complete peace and in a constant harmony with nature, also has many families from other parts of the country who seek to get away from the intense noise and pollution of their places originally.

Chalacatepec 
Pradisiaca white sand beach, which is part of the great coastline that makes up the municipality of Tomatlán, this charming place is made up of several scenarios, highlighting the vegetation, the sea and the group of rocks that frame the beach.

In its warm sands we can appreciate a great variety of wildlife, which is considered unique throughout the world, the intense blue of the sky makes it confused with the sea on the horizon.

Chalacatepec has become an ideal place for the reproduction of the beautiful sea turtle, since year after year it seeks the warmth of its beach to lay eggs, which are currently protected by a turtle camp that sits here.

Peñitas de la Cruz 
This is another of the beautiful beaches that characterize Tomatlan. Ideal for swimming, resting and camping, receiving visitors who come to enjoy its attractions on weekends, it gives tourist life to the municipality.

Cajón de Peñas Dam
The largest dam in Jalisco, with its immense curtain that looks like a fortress that keeps the most picturesque landscapes, surrounded by a range of greens that contrast with each other and where water sports such as bass fishing, skiing and windsurfing are practiced. It also has comfortable cabins to rest and forget the daily routine.

The Painted Stone
Located on the banks of the Tomatlàn River, this unique cave painting in Mesoamerica, is 40 meters high by 8 meters long and 2 meters wide, and is pigmented in red.

It is noteworthy that in the entire riverbank of the Tomatlan River there are vestiges of ancient cultures, abundant petroglyphs among which a "Patolli Game" of which there are only two in western Mexico.

Temple of Saint James the Apostle
This parish, in the center of Tomatlan, is an architectural jewel of the Franciscan style, made of stone, lime and quarry. Its walls have a thickness of one and a half meters and its roof is half-round with a beautiful vault that tops the presbytery. The Baptistry and Sacristy are also vaulted; a quarry snail leads to the bell tower, climbing 49 reduced steps, which forces it to step on its side, to its low tower 6 meters base by 4 high.

Notable people
 

Randy Santana (born 1983), Mexican former professional footballer

Sister cities
 Lincoln County, Nevada, USA
 Coconino County, Arizona, USA
 Aroostook County, Maine, USA
 North Slope Borough, Alaska, USA
 Béthune, FRA

References

Municipalities of Jalisco